Chenar-e Naz (also Romanized as Chenār-e Nāz and Chenār Nāz; also known as Chenār Nār) is a village in Isar Rural District, Marvast District, Khatam County, Yazd Province, Iran. 

In 2006, the village had a population of 144 families, totalling 509 individuals.

References 

Populated places in Khatam County